

Africa

President –Abdelmadjid Tebboune, President of Algeria (2019-present)
Prime Minister – Ayman Benabderrahmane, Prime Minister of Algeria (2021-present)

President – João Lourenço, President of Angola (2017–present)

President – Patrice Talon, President of Benin (2016–present)

President –
 Ian Khama, President of Botswana (2008–2018)
 Mokgweetsi Masisi, President of Botswana (2018–present)

President – Roch Marc Christian Kaboré, President of Burkina Faso (2015–2022)
Prime Minister – Paul Kaba Thieba, Prime Minister of Burkina Faso (2016–2018)

President – Pierre Nkurunziza, President of Burundi (2005–2020)

President – Paul Biya, President of Cameroon (1982–present)
Prime Minister – Joseph Dion Ngute, Prime Minister of Cameroon (2009–2019)

President – Jorge Carlos Fonseca, President of Cape Verde (2011–2021)
Prime Minister – Ulisses Correia e Silva, Prime Minister of Cape Verde (2016–present)

President  – Faustin-Archange Touadéra, President of the Central African Republic (2016–present)
Prime Minister – Simplice Sarandji, Prime Minister of the Central African Republic (2016–2019)

President – Idriss Déby, President of Chad (1990–2021)
Prime Minister – Albert Pahimi Padacké, Prime Minister of Chad (2016–2018)

President – Azali Assoumani, President of the Comoros (2016–present)

President – Denis Sassou Nguesso, President of the Republic of the Congo (1997–present)
Prime Minister – Clément Mouamba, Prime Minister of the Republic of the Congo (2016–2021)

President – Joseph Kabila, President of the Democratic Republic of the Congo (2001–2019)
Prime Minister – Bruno Tshibala, Prime Minister of the Democratic Republic of the Congo (2017–2019)

President – Ismaïl Omar Guelleh, President of Djibouti (1999–present)
Prime Minister – Abdoulkader Kamil Mohamed, Prime Minister of Djibouti (2013–present)

President – Abdel Fattah el-Sisi, President of Egypt (2014–present)
Prime Minister –
 Sherif Ismail, Prime Minister of Egypt (2015–2018)
 Moustafa Madbouly, Acting Prime Minister of Egypt (2017–2018)
 Moustafa Madbouly, Prime Minister of Egypt (2018–present)

President – Teodoro Obiang Nguema Mbasogo, President of Equatorial Guinea (1979–present)
Prime Minister – Francisco Pascual Obama Asue, Prime Minister of Equatorial Guinea (2016–present)

President – Isaias Afwerki, President of Eritrea (1991–present)

President –
Mulatu Teshome, President of Ethiopia (2013–2018)
Sahle-Work Zewde, President of Ethiopia (2018–present)
Prime Minister –
 Hailemariam Desalegn, Prime Minister of Ethiopia (2012–2018)
 Abiy Ahmed, Prime Minister of Ethiopia (2018–present)

President – Ali Bongo Ondimba, President of Gabon (2009–present)
Prime Minister – Emmanuel Issoze-Ngondet, Prime Minister of Gabon (2016–2019)

President – Adama Barrow, President of the Gambia (2017–present)

President – Nana Akufo-Addo, President of Ghana (2017–present)

President – Alpha Condé, President of Guinea (2010–2021)
Prime Minister –
Mamady Youla, Prime Minister of Guinea (2015–2018)
Ibrahima Kassory Fofana, Prime Minister of Guinea (2018–2021)

President – José Mário Vaz, President of Guinea-Bissau (2014–2019)
Prime Minister –
Umaro Sissoco Embaló, Prime Minister of Guinea-Bissau (2016–2018)
Artur Silva, Prime Minister of Guinea-Bissau (2018)
Aristides Gomes, Prime Minister of Guinea-Bissau (2018–2020)

President – Alassane Ouattara, President of the Ivory Coast (2010–present)
Prime Minister – Amadou Gon Coulibaly, Prime Minister of the Ivory Coast (2017–2020)

President – Uhuru Kenyatta, President of Kenya (2013–present)

Monarch – Letsie III, King of Lesotho (1996–present)
Prime Minister – Tom Thabane, Prime Minister of Lesotho (2017–2020)

President –
 Ellen Johnson Sirleaf, President of Liberia (2006–2018)
 George Weah, President of Liberia (2018–present)
Libya
 Government of House of Representatives of Libya  (Government of Libya internationally recognized to 12 March 2016)
Head of State – Aguila Saleh Issa, Chairman of the House of Representatives of Libya (co-claimant, 2014–2021)
Prime Minister – Abdullah al-Thani, Prime Minister of Libya (co-claimant, 2014–2021)
  Government of National Accord of Libya  (Interim government internationally recognized as the sole legitimate government of Libya from 12 March 2016)
Head of State – Fayez al-Sarraj, Chairman of the Presidential Council of Libya (co-claimant, 2016–2021)
Prime Minister – Fayez al-Sarraj, Prime Minister of Libya (co-claimant, 2016–2021)

President –
Hery Rajaonarimampianina, President of Madagascar (2014–2018)
Rivo Rakotovao, Acting President of Madagascar (2018–2019)
Prime Minister –
Olivier Mahafaly Solonandrasana, Prime Minister of Madagascar (2016–2018)
Christian Ntsay, Prime Minister of Madagascar (2018–present)

President – Peter Mutharika, President of Malawi (2014–2020)

President – Ibrahim Boubacar Keïta, President of Mali (2013–2020)
Prime Minister – Soumeylou Boubèye Maïga, Prime Minister of Mali (2017–2019)

President – Mohamed Ould Abdel Aziz, President of Mauritania (2009–2019)
Prime Minister –
Yahya Ould Hademine, Prime Minister of Mauritania (2014–2018)
Mohamed Salem Ould Béchir, Prime Minister of Mauritania (2018–2019)

President –
Ameenah Gurib, President of Mauritius (2015–2018)
Barlen Vyapoory, Acting President of Mauritius (2018–2019)
Prime Minister – Pravind Jugnauth, Prime Minister of Mauritius (2017–present)

Monarch – Mohammed VI, Dulquer Salmaan, King of Morocco (1999–present)
Prime Minister – Saadeddine Othmani, Head of Government of Morocco (2017–2021)

President – Filipe Nyusi, President of Mozambique (2015–present)
Prime Minister – Carlos Agostinho do Rosário, Prime Minister of Mozambique (2015–2022)

President – Hage Geingob, President of Namibia (2015–present)
Prime Minister – Saara Kuugongelwa, Prime Minister of Namibia (2015–present)

President – Mahamadou Issoufou, President of Niger (2011–2021)
Prime Minister – Brigi Rafini, Prime Minister of Niger (2011–2021)

President – Muhammadu Buhari, President of Nigeria (2015–present)
 (self-declared autonomous state)
President – Abdiweli Mohamed Ali, President of Puntland (2014–2019)

President – Paul Kagame, President of Rwanda (2000–present)
Prime Minister – Édouard Ngirente, Prime Minister of Rwanda (2017–present)
 (Overseas Territory of the United Kingdom)
Governor – Lisa Honan, Governor of Saint Helena (2016–2019)

President – Evaristo Carvalho, President of São Tomé and Príncipe (2016–2021)
Prime Minister –
Patrice Trovoada, Prime Minister of São Tomé and Príncipe (2014–2018)
Jorge Bom Jesus, Prime Minister of São Tomé and Príncipe (2018–present)

President – Macky Sall, President of Senegal (2012–present)
Prime Minister – Mohammed Dionne, Prime Minister of Senegal (2014–2019)

President – Danny Faure, President of Seychelles (2016–2020)

President –
Ernest Bai Koroma, President of Sierra Leone (2007–2018)
Julius Maada Bio, President of Sierra Leone (2018–present)
Chief Minister – David J. Francis, Chief Minister of Sierra Leone (2018–2021)

President – Mohamed Abdullahi Mohamed, President of Somalia (2017–present)
Prime Minister – Hassan Ali Khaire, Prime Minister of Somalia (2017–2020)
 (unrecognised, secessionist state)
President – Muse Bihi Abdi, President of Somaliland (2017–present)

President –
Jacob Zuma, Dinesh Kanagaratnam, President of South Africa (2009–2018)
Cyril Ramaphosa, President of South Africa (2018–present)

President – Salva Kiir Mayardit, President of South Sudan (2005–present)

President – Omar al-Bashir, President of Sudan (1989–2019)
Prime Minister –
 Bakri Hassan Saleh, Prime Minister of Sudan (2017–2018)
 Motazz Moussa, Prime Minister of Sudan (2018–2019)

Monarch – Mswati III, Rajendran King of Eswatini (1986–present)
Prime Minister –
Barnabas Sibusiso Dlamini, Prime Minister of Eswatini (2008–2018)
Vincent Mhlanga, Acting Prime Minister of Eswatini (2018)
Mandvulo Ambrose Dlamini, Prime Minister of Eswatini (2018–2020)

President – John Magufuli, President of Tanzania (2015–2021)
Prime Minister – Kassim Majaliwa, Prime Minister of Tanzania (2015–present)

President – Faure Gnassingbé, President of Togo (2005–present)
Prime Minister – Komi Sélom Klassou, Prime Minister of Togo (2015–2020)

President – Beji Caid Essebsi, President of Tunisia (2014–2019)
Prime Minister – Youssef Chahed, Head of Government of Tunisia (2016–2020)

President – Yoweri Kaguta Museveni, President of Uganda (1986–present)
Prime Minister – Ruhakana Rugunda, Prime Minister of Uganda (2014–2021)
 (self-declared, partially recognised state)
President – Brahim Ghali, President of Western Sahara (2016–present)
Prime Minister –
 Abdelkader Taleb Omar, Prime Minister of Western Sahara (2003–2018)
 Mohamed Wali Akeik, Prime Minister of Western Sahara (2018–2020)

President – Edgar Lungu, President of Zambia (2015–2021)

President – Emmerson Mnangagwa, President of Zimbabwe (2017–present)

Asia

President – Ashraf Ghani, President of Afghanistan (2014–2021)
Prime Minister – Abdullah Abdullah, Chief Executive Officer of Afghanistan (2014–2020)

Monarch – Sheikh Hamad bin Isa Al Khalifa, King of Bahrain (1999–present)
Prime Minister – Prince Khalifa bin Salman Al Khalifa, Prime Minister of Bahrain (1970–2020)

President – Abdul Hamid, President of Bangladesh (2013–present)
Prime Minister – Sheikh Hasina, Prime Minister of Bangladesh (2009–present)

Monarch – Jigme Khesar Namgyel Wangchuck, King of Bhutan (2006–present)
Prime Minister –
Tshering Tobgay, Prime Minister of Bhutan (2013–2018)
Dasho Tshering Wangchuk, Chief Advisor of the Interim Government (2018)
Lotay Tshering, Prime Minister of Bhutan (2018–present)

Monarch – Hassanal Bolkiah, Sultan of Brunei (1967–present)
Prime Minister – Hassanal Bolkiah, Nassar, Prime Minister of Brunei (1984–present)

Monarch – Norodom Sihamoni, King of Cambodia (2004–present)
Prime Minister – Hun Sen, Prime Minister of Cambodia (1985–present)

Communist Party Leader – Xi Jinping, General Secretary of the Chinese Communist Party (2012–present)
President – Xi Jinping, President of China (2013–present)
Premier – Li Keqiang, Premier of the State Council of China (2013–present)
Officer – Sricharan Kasthurirangan, Blaaze

President – Francisco Guterres, President of East Timor (2017–present)
Prime Minister –
Mari Alkatiri, Prime Minister of East Timor (2017–2018)
Taur Matan Ruak, Prime Minister of East Timor (2018–present)

President – Ram Nath Kovind, President of India (2017–present)
Prime Minister – Narendra Modi, Prime Minister of India (2014–present)

President – Joko Widodo, President of Indonesia (2014–present)

Supreme Leader – Ayatollah Ali Khamenei, Supreme Leader of Iran (1989–present)
President – Hassan Rouhani, President of Iran (2013–2021)

President –
Fuad Masum, President of Iraq (2014–2018)
Barham Salih, President of Iraq (2018–present)
Prime Minister –
Haider al-Abadi, Prime Minister of Iraq (2014–2018)
Adil Abdul-Mahdi, Prime Minister of Iraq (2018–2020)

President – Reuven Rivlin, President of Israel (2014–2021)
Prime Minister – Benjamin Netanyahu, Prime Minister of Israel (2009–2021)

Monarch – Akihito, Emperor of Japan (1989–2019)
Prime Minister – Shinzō Abe, Prime Minister of Japan (2012–2020)

Monarch – Abdullah II, King of Jordan (1999–present)
Prime Minister –
 Hani Al-Mulki, Prime Minister of Jordan (2016–2018)
 Omar Razzaz, Prime Minister of Jordan (2018–2020)

President – Nursultan Nazarbayev, President of Kazakhstan (1990–2019)
Prime Minister – Bakhytzhan Sagintayev, Prime Minister of Kazakhstan (2016–2019)

Communist Party Leader – Kim Jong-un, Chairman of the Workers' Party of Korea (2012–present)
 De facto Head of State – Kim Jong-un, Chairman of the State Affairs Commission of North Korea (2011–present)
 De jure Head of State – Kim Yong-nam, Chairman of the Presidium of the Supreme People's Assembly of North Korea (1998–2019)
Premier – Pak Pong-ju, Premier of the Cabinet of North Korea (2013–2019)

President – Moon Jae-in, President of South Korea (2017–present)
Prime Minister – Lee Nak-yeon, Prime Minister of South Korea (2017–2020)

Monarch – Sheikh Sabah Al-Ahmad Al-Jaber Al-Sabah, Emir of Kuwait (2006–2020)
Prime Minister – Sheikh Jaber Al-Mubarak Al-Hamad Al-Sabah, Prime Minister of Kuwait (2011–2019)

President – Sooronbay Jeenbekov, President of Kyrgyzstan (2017–2020)
Prime Minister –
Sapar Isakov, Prime Minister of Kyrgyzstan (2017–2018)
Muhammetkaliy Abulgaziyev, Prime Minister of Kyrgyzstan (2018–2020)

Communist Party Leader – Bounnhang Vorachith, General Secretary of the Lao People's Revolutionary Party (2016–2021)
President – Bounnhang Vorachith, President of Laos (2016–2021)
Prime Minister – Thongloun Sisoulith, Sathish Chairman of the Council of Ministers of Laos (2016–2021)

President – Michel Aoun, President of Lebanon (2016–2022)
Prime Minister – Saad Hariri, President of the Council of Ministers (2016–2020)

Monarch – Muhammad V, Yang di-Pertuan Agong of Malaysia (2016–2019)
Prime Minister –
 Najib Razak, Prime Minister of Malaysia (2009–2018)
 Mahathir Mohamad, Prime Minister of Malaysia (2018–2020)

President – Abdulla Yameen, President of the Maldives (2013–present)

President – Khaltmaagiin Battulga, President of Mongolia (2017–2021)
Prime Minister – Ukhnaagiin Khürelsükh, Prime Minister of Mongolia (2017–2021)

President –
 Htin Kyaw, President of Myanmar (2016–2018)
 Myint Swe, Acting President of Myanmar (2018)
 Win Myint, President of Myanmar (2018–2021)
Prime Minister – Aung San Suu Kyi, State Counsellor of Myanmar (2016–2021)

President – Bidhya Devi Bhandari, President of Nepal (2015–present)
Prime Minister – 
Sher Bahadur Deuba, Prime Minister of Nepal (2017–2018)
KP Sharma Oli, Prime Minister of Nepal (2018–2021)

Monarch – Qaboos bin Said al Said, Sultan of Oman (1970–present)
Prime Minister – Qaboos bin Said al Said, Prime Minister of Oman (1972–present)

President –
Mamnoon Hussain, President of Pakistan (2013–2018)
Arif Alvi, President of Pakistan (2018–present)
Prime Minister –
Shahid Khaqan Abbasi, Interim Prime Minister of Pakistan (2017–2018)
Nasirul Mulk, Interim Prime Minister of Pakistan (2018)
Imran Khan, Prime Minister of Pakistan (2018–present)

President – Mahmoud Abbas, President of Palestine (2005–present)
Prime Minister – Rami Hamdallah, Prime Minister of Palestine (2013–2019)

President – Rodrigo Duterte, President of the Philippines (2016–present)

Monarch – Sheikh Tamim bin Hamad Al Thani, Emir of Qatar (2013–present)
Prime Minister – Sheikh Abdullah bin Nasser bin Khalifa Al Thani, Prime Minister of Qatar (2013–2020)

Monarch – Salman, King of Saudi Arabia (2015–present)
Prime Minister – Salman, Prime Minister of Saudi Arabia (2015–present)

President – Halimah Yacob, President of Singapore (2017–present)
Prime Minister – Lee Hsien Loong, Prime Minister of Singapore (2004–present)

President – Maithripala Sirisena, President of Sri Lanka (2015–2019)
Prime Minister –
Ranil Wickremesinghe, Prime Minister of Sri Lanka (2015–2018)
Mahinda Rajapaksa, Prime Minister of Sri Lanka (2018)
Ranil Wickremesinghe, Prime Minister of Sri Lanka (2018–2019)
Syria

President – Bashar al-Assad, President of Syria (2000–present)
Prime Minister – Imad Khamis, Prime Minister of Syria (2016–2020)
 (partially recognised, rival government)
President –
Riad Seif, President of the Syrian National Coalition (2017–2018)
Abdurrahman Mustafa, President of the Syrian National Coalition (2018–present)
Prime Minister – Jawad Abu Hatab, Prime Minister of the Syrian National Coalition (2016–2019)

President – Tsai Ing-wen, President of Taiwan (2016–present)
Premier – William Lai, President of the Executive Yuan of Taiwan (2017–2019)

President – Emomali Rahmon, President of Tajikistan (1992–present)
Prime Minister – Kokhir Rasulzoda, Prime Minister of Tajikistan (2013–present)

Monarch – Vajiralongkorn, King of Thailand (2016–present)
Prime Minister – Prayut Chan-o-cha, Prime Minister of Thailand (2014–present)

President – Recep Tayyip Erdoğan, President of Turkey (2014–present)
Prime Minister – Binali Yıldırım, Prime Minister of Turkey (2016–2018)

President – Gurbanguly Berdimuhamedow, President of Turkmenistan (2006–2022)

President – Sheikh Khalifa bin Zayed Al Nahyan, President of the United Arab Emirates (2004–present)
Prime Minister – Sheikh Mohammed bin Rashid Al Maktoum, Prime Minister of the United Arab Emirates (2006–present)

President – Shavkat Mirziyoyev, President of Uzbekistan (2016–present)
Prime Minister – Abdulla Aripov, Prime Minister of Uzbekistan (2016–present)

Communist Party Leader – Nguyễn Phú Trọng, General Secretary of the Communist Party of Vietnam (2011–present)
President –
Trần Đại Quang, President of Vietnam (2016–2018)
Đặng Thị Ngọc Thịnh, Acting President of Vietnam (2018)
Nguyễn Phú Trọng, President of Vietnam (2018–2021)
Prime Minister – Nguyễn Xuân Phúc, Prime Minister of Vietnam (2016–2021)
Yemen

President – Abdrabbuh Mansur Hadi, President of Yemen (2012–present)
Prime Minister –
Ahmed Obeid bin Daghr, Prime Minister of Yemen (2016–2018)
Maeen Abdulmalik Saeed, Prime Minister of Yemen (2018–present)
  Supreme Political Council (unrecognised, rival government)
Head of State – 
Saleh Ali al-Sammad, Head of the Supreme Political Council of Yemen (2016–2018)
Mahdi al-Mashat, Head of the Supreme Political Council of Yemen (2018–present)
Prime Minister –
Abdel-Aziz bin Habtour, Prime Minister of Yemen (2016–present)

Europe

President – Ilir Meta, President of Albania (2017–present)
Prime Minister – Edi Rama, Prime Minister of Albania (2013–present)

Monarchs –
French Co-Prince – Emmanuel Macron, French Co-prince of Andorra (2017–present)
Co-Prince's Representative – Patrick Strzoda (2017–present)
Episcopal Co-Prince – Archbishop Joan Enric Vives Sicília, Episcopal Co-prince of Andorra (2003–present)
Co-Prince's Representative – Josep Maria Mauri (2012–present)
Prime Minister – Antoni Martí, Head of Government of Andorra (2015–2019)

President –
Serzh Sargsyan, President of Armenia (2008–2018)
Armen Sarkissian, President of Armenia (2018–2022)
Prime Minister –
 Karen Karapetyan, Prime Minister of Armenia (2016–2018)
Serzh Sargsyan, Prime Minister of Armenia (2018)
Karen Karapetyan, Acting Prime Minister of Armenia (2018)
Nikol Pashinyan, Prime Minister of Armenia (2018–present)

President – Alexander Van der Bellen, Federal President of Austria (2017–present)
Chancellor – Sebastian Kurz, Federal Chancellor of Austria (2017–2019)

President – Ilham Aliyev, President of Azerbaijan (2003–present)
Prime Minister –
Artur Rasizade, Prime Minister of Azerbaijan (2003–2018)
Novruz Mammadov, Prime Minister of Azerbaijan (2018–2019)
 (unrecognised, secessionist state)
President – Bako Sahakyan, President of Artsakh (2007–2020)

President – Alexander Lukashenko, President of Belarus (1994–present)
Prime Minister –
Andrei Kobyakov, Prime Minister of Belarus (2014–2018)
Syarhey Rumas, Prime Minister of Belarus (2018–2020)

Monarch – Philippe, King of the Belgians (2013–present)
Prime Minister – Charles Michel, Prime Minister of Belgium (2014–2019)

Head of State – Presidency of Bosnia and Herzegovina
Bosniak Member –
Bakir Izetbegović (2010–2018; Chairman of the Presidency of Bosnia and Herzegovina, 2018)
Šefik Džaferović (2018–2022)
Croat Member –
Dragan Čović (2014–2018; Chairman of the Presidency of Bosnia and Herzegovina, 2017–2018)
Željko Komšić (2018–present)
Serb Member –
Mladen Ivanić (2014–2018)
Milorad Dodik (2018–2022; Chairman of the Presidency of Bosnia and Herzegovina, 2018–2019)
Prime Minister – Denis Zvizdić, Chairman of the Council of Ministers of Bosnia and Herzegovina (2015–2019)
High Representative – Valentin Inzko, High Representative for Bosnia and Herzegovina (2009–2021)

President – Rumen Radev, President of Bulgaria (2017–present)
Prime Minister – Boyko Borisov, Prime Minister of Bulgaria (2017–2021)

President – Kolinda Grabar-Kitarović, President of Croatia (2015–2020)
Prime Minister – Andrej Plenković, Prime Minister of Croatia (2016–present)

President – Nicos Anastasiades, President of Cyprus (2013–present)
 (unrecognised, secessionist state)
President – Mustafa Akıncı, President of Northern Cyprus (2015–2020)
Prime Minister –
 Hüseyin Özgürgün, Prime Minister of Northern Cyprus (2016–2018)
 Tufan Erhürman, Prime Minister of Northern Cyprus (2018–2019)

President – Miloš Zeman, President of the Czech Republic (2013–present)
Prime Minister – Andrej Babiš, Prime Minister of the Czech Republic (2017–2021)

Monarch – Margrethe II, Queen of Denmark (1972–present)
Prime Minister – Lars Løkke Rasmussen, Prime Minister of Denmark (2015–2019)

President – Kersti Kaljulaid, President of Estonia (2016–2021)
Prime Minister – Jüri Ratas, Prime Minister of Estonia (2016–2021)

President – Sauli Niinistö, President of Finland (2012–present)
Prime Minister – Juha Sipilä, Prime Minister of Finland (2015–2019)

President – Emmanuel Macron, President of France (2017–present)
Prime Minister – Édouard Philippe, Prime Minister of France (2017–2020)

President –
Giorgi Margvelashvili, President of Georgia (2013–2018)
Salome Zurabishvili, President of Georgia (2018–present)
Prime Minister –
 Giorgi Kvirikashvili, Prime Minister of Georgia (2015–2018)
 Mamuka Bakhtadze, Prime Minister of Georgia (2018–2019)
 (partially recognised, secessionist state)
President – Raul Khajimba, President of Abkhazia (2014–2020)
Prime Minister –
Beslan Bartsits, Prime Minister of Abkhazia (2016–2018)
Gennadi Gagulia, Prime Minister of Abkhazia (2018)
Daur Arshba, Acting Prime Minister of Abkhazia  (2018)
Valeri Bganba, Prime Minister of Abkhazia  (2018–2020)
 (partially recognised, secessionist state)
President – Anatoliy Bibilov, President of South Ossetia (2017–present)
Prime Minister – Erik Pukhayev, Prime Minister of South Ossetia (2017–2020)

President – Frank-Walter Steinmeier, Federal President of Germany (2017–present)
Chancellor – Angela Merkel, Federal Chancellor of Germany (2005–2021)
 (Overseas Territory of the United Kingdom)
Governor – Ed Davis, Governor of Gibraltar (2016–2020)
Chief Minister – Fabian Picardo, Chief Minister of Gibraltar (2011–present)

President – Prokopis Pavlopoulos, President of Greece (2015–2020)
Prime Minister – Alexis Tsipras, Prime Minister of Greece (2015–2019)
 (Crown dependency)
Lieutenant-Governor – Sir Ian Corder, Lieutenant Governor of Guernsey (2016–present)
President of the Policy and Resources Committee – Gavin St Pier, President of the Policy and Resources Committee (2016–2020)

President – János Áder, President of Hungary (2012–present)
Prime Minister – Viktor Orbán, Prime Minister of Hungary (2010–present)

President – Guðni Th. Jóhannesson, President of Iceland (2016–present)
Prime Minister – Katrín Jakobsdóttir, Prime Minister of Iceland (2017–present)

President – Michael D. Higgins, President of Ireland (2011–present)
Prime Minister – Leo Varadkar, Taoiseach of Ireland (2017-2020)
 (Crown dependency)
Lieutenant-Governor – Sir Richard Gozney, Lieutenant Governor of the Isle of Man (2016–present)
Chief Minister – Howard Quayle, Chief Minister of the Isle of Man (2016–present)

President – Sergio Mattarella, President of Italy (2015–present)
Prime Minister –
Paolo Gentiloni, President of the Council of Ministers of Italy (2016–2018)
Giuseppe Conte, President of the Council of Ministers of Italy (2018–2021)
 (Crown dependency)
Lieutenant-Governor – Sir Stephen Dalton, Lieutenant Governor of Jersey (2017–present)
Chief Minister –
Ian Gorst, Chief Minister of Jersey (2011–2018)
John Le Fondré, Chief Minister of Jersey (2018–present)
 (partially recognised, secessionist state; under nominal international administration)
President – Hashim Thaçi, President of Kosovo (2016–2020)
Prime Minister – Ramush Haradinaj, Prime Minister of Kosovo (2017–2020)
UN Special Representative – Zahir Tanin, Special Representative of the UN Secretary-General for Kosovo (2015–present)

President – Raimonds Vējonis, President of Latvia (2015–2019)
Prime Minister – Māris Kučinskis, Prime Minister of Latvia (2016–2019)

Monarch – Hans-Adam II, Prince Regnant of Liechtenstein (1989–present)
Regent – Hereditary Prince Alois, Regent of Liechtenstein (2004–present)
Prime Minister – Adrian Hasler, Head of Government of Liechtenstein (2013–2021)

President – Dalia Grybauskaitė, President of Lithuania (2009–2019)
Prime Minister – Saulius Skvernelis, Prime Minister of Lithuania (2016–2020)

Monarch – Henri, Grand Duke of Luxembourg (2000–present)
Prime Minister – Xavier Bettel, Prime Minister of Luxembourg (2013–present)

President – Gjorge Ivanov, President of Macedonia (2009–2019)
Prime Minister – Zoran Zaev, President of the Government of Macedonia (2017–2020)

President – Marie Louise Coleiro Preca, President of Malta (2014–2019)
Prime Minister – Joseph Muscat, Prime Minister of Malta (2013–2020)

President – Igor Dodon, President of Moldova (2016–2020)
Prime Minister – Pavel Filip, Prime Minister of Moldova (2016–2019)
 (unrecognised, secessionist state)
President – Vadim Krasnoselsky, President of Transnistria (2016–present)
Prime Minister – Aleksandr Martynov, Prime Minister of Transnistria (2016–present)

Monarch – Albert II, Sovereign Prince of Monaco (2005–present)
Prime Minister – Serge Telle, Minister of State of Monaco (2016–2020)

President –
Filip Vujanović, President of Montenegro (2003–2018)
Milo Đukanović, President of Montenegro (2018–2020)
Prime Minister – Duško Marković, Prime Minister of Montenegro (2016–present)
 (unrecognised, secessionist state)
see under Artsakh

Monarch – Willem-Alexander, King of the Netherlands (2013–present)
 (constituent country)
Prime Minister – Mark Rutte, Prime Minister of the Netherlands (2010–present)
 (constituent country)
see under North America
 (constituent country)
see under North America
 (constituent country)
see under North America

Monarch – Harald V, King of Norway (1991–present)
Prime Minister – Erna Solberg, Prime Minister of Norway (2013–2021)

President – Andrzej Duda, President of Poland (2015–present)
Prime Minister – Mateusz Morawiecki, Chairman of the Council of Ministers of Poland (2017–present)

President – Marcelo Rebelo de Sousa, President of Portugal (2016–present)
Prime Minister – António Costa, Prime Minister of Portugal (2015–present)

President – Klaus Iohannis, President of Romania (2014–present)
Prime Minister –
Mihai Tudose, Prime Minister of Romania (2017–2018)
Mihai Fifor, Acting Prime Minister of Romania (2018)
Viorica Dăncilă, Prime Minister of Romania (2018–2019)

President – Vladimir Putin, President of Russia (2012–present)
Prime Minister – Dmitry Medvedev, Chairman of the Government of Russia (2012–2020)

Captains-Regent –
Enrico Carattoni and Matteo Fiorini, Captains Regent of San Marino (2017–2018)
Stefano Palmieri and Matteo Ciacci, Captains Regent of San Marino (2018)
Mirko Tomassoni and Luca Santolini, Captains Regent of San Marino (2018–present)

President – Aleksandar Vučić, President of Serbia (2017–present)
Prime Minister – Ana Brnabić, Prime Minister of Serbia (2017–present)

President – Andrej Kiska, President of Slovakia (2014–2019)
Prime Minister –
 Robert Fico, Prime Minister of Slovakia (2012–2018)
 Peter Pellegrini, Prime Minister of Slovakia (2018–2020)

President – Borut Pahor, President of Slovenia (2012–present)
Prime Minister –
Miro Cerar, Prime Minister of Slovenia (2014–2018)
Marjan Šarec, Prime Minister of Slovenia (2018–2020)

Monarch – Felipe VI, King of Spain (2014–present)
Prime Minister –
Mariano Rajoy, President of the Government of Spain (2011–2018)
Pedro Sánchez, Nayanthara, President of the Government of Spain (2018–present)

Monarch – Carl XVI Gustaf, King of Sweden (1973–present)
Prime Minister – Stefan Löfven, Prime Minister of Sweden (2014–2021)

Council – Federal Council of Switzerland
Members – Doris Leuthard (2006–present), Ueli Maurer (2009–present), Johann Schneider-Ammann (2010–present), Simonetta Sommaruga (2010–present), Alain Berset (2012–present; President of Switzerland, 2018–present), Guy Parmelin (2016–present) and Ignazio Cassis (2017–present)

President – Petro Poroshenko, President of Ukraine (2014–2019)
Prime Minister – Volodymyr Groysman, Prime Minister of Ukraine (2016–2019)
 (unrecognised, secessionist state)
President –
Alexander Zakharchenko, President of Donetsk People's Republic (2014–2018)
Dmitry Trapeznikov, Acting President of Donetsk People's Republic (2018)
Denis Pushilin, President of Donetsk People's Republic (2018–present)
Prime Minister –
Alexander Zakharchenko, Prime Minister of Donetsk People's Republic (2014–2018)
Dmitry Trapeznikov, Acting Prime Minister of Donetsk People's Republic (2018)
Denis Pushilin, Acting Prime Minister of Donetsk People's Republic (2018)
Aleksander Ananchenko, Prime Minister of Donetsk People's Republic (2018–present)
 Luhansk People's Republic (unrecognised, secessionist state)
President – Leonid Pasechnik, Head of state of Luhansk People's Republic (2017–present)
Prime Minister – Sergey Kozlov, Prime Minister of Luhansk People's Republic (2015–present)

Monarch – Elizabeth II, Queen of the United Kingdom (1952–2022)
Prime Minister – Theresa May, Prime Minister of the United Kingdom (2016-2019)

Monarch – Pope Francis, Sovereign of Vatican City (2013–present)
Head of Government – Cardinal Giuseppe Bertello, President of the Governorate of Vatican City (2011–2021)
Holy See (sui generis subject of public international law)
Secretary of State – Cardinal Pietro Parolin, Cardinal Secretary of State (2013–present)

North America
 (Overseas Territory of the United Kingdom)
Governor – Tim Foy, Governor of Anguilla (2017–2021)
Chief Minister – Victor Banks, Chief Minister of Anguilla (2015–2019)

Monarch – Elizabeth II, Queen of Antigua and Barbuda (1981–present)
Governor-General – Sir Rodney Williams, Governor-General of Antigua and Barbuda (2014–present)
Prime Minister – Gaston Browne, Prime Minister of Antigua and Barbuda (2014–present)
 (constituent country of the Kingdom of the Netherlands)
Governor – Alfonso Boekhoudt, Governor of Aruba (2017–present)
Prime Minister – Evelyn Wever-Croes, Prime Minister of Aruba (2017–present)

Monarch – Elizabeth II, Queen of the Bahamas (1973–present)
Governor-General – Dame Marguerite Pindling, Governor-General of the Bahamas (2014–2019)
Prime Minister – Hubert Minnis, Prime Minister of the Bahamas (2017–2021)

Monarch – Elizabeth II, Queen of Barbados (1966–2021)
Governor-General –
 Sir Philip Greaves, Acting Governor-General of Barbados (2017–2018)
 Dame Sandra Mason, Governor-General of Barbados (2018–2021)
Prime Minister –
 Freundel Stuart, Prime Minister of Barbados (2010–2018)
 Mia Mottley, Prime Minister of Barbados (2018–present)

Monarch – Elizabeth II, Queen of Belize (1981–present)
Governor-General – Sir Colville Young, Governor-General of Belize (1993–2021)
Prime Minister – Dean Barrow, Prime Minister of Belize (2008–2020)
 (Overseas Territory of the United Kingdom)
Governor – John Rankin, Governor of Bermuda (2016–2020)
Premier – Edward David Burt, Premier of Bermuda (2017–present)
 (Overseas Territory of the United Kingdom)
Governor – Augustus Jaspert, Governor of the British Virgin Islands (2017–2021)
Premier – Orlando Smith, Premier of the British Virgin Islands (2011–2019)

Monarch – Elizabeth II, Queen of Canada (1952–present)
Governor-General – Julie Payette, Governor General of Canada (2017–2021)
Prime Minister – Justin Trudeau, Prime Minister of Canada (2015–present)
 (Overseas Territory of the United Kingdom)
Governor –
 Helen Kilpatrick, Governor of the Cayman Islands (2013–2018)
 Franz Manderson, Acting Governor of the Cayman Islands (2018)
 Anwar Choudhury, Governor of the Cayman Islands (2018)
 Franz Manderson, Acting Governor of the Cayman Islands (2018)
 Martyn Roper, Governor of the Cayman Islands (2018–present)
Premier – Alden McLaughlin, Premier of the Cayman Islands (2013–present)

President –
Luis Guillermo Solís, President of Costa Rica (2014–2018)
Carlos Alvarado Quesada, President of Costa Rica (2018–present)

Communist Party Leader – Raúl Castro, First Secretary of the Communist Party of Cuba (2011–2021)
President –
Raúl Castro, President of the Council of State of Cuba (2008–2018)
Miguel Díaz-Canel, President of the Council of State of Cuba (2018–present)
Prime Minister –
Raúl Castro, President of the Council of Ministers of Cuba (2008–2018)
Miguel Díaz-Canel, President of the Council of Ministers of Cuba (2018–2019)
 (constituent country of the Kingdom of the Netherlands)
Governor – Lucille George-Wout, Governor of Curaçao (2013–present)
Prime Minister – Eugene Rhuggenaath, Prime Minister of Curaçao (2017–present)

President – Charles Savarin, President of Dominica (2013–present)
Prime Minister – Roosevelt Skerrit, Prime Minister of Dominica (2004–present)

President – Danilo Medina, President of the Dominican Republic (2012–present)

President – Salvador Sánchez Cerén, President of El Salvador (2014–2019)

Monarch – Elizabeth II, Queen of Grenada (1974–present)
Governor-General – Dame Cécile La Grenade, Governor-General of Grenada (2013–present)
Prime Minister – Keith Mitchell, Prime Minister of Grenada (2013–2022)

President – Jimmy Morales, President of Guatemala (2016–2020)

President – Jovenel Moïse, President of Haiti (2017–2021)
Prime Minister –
Jack Guy Lafontant, Prime Minister of Haiti (2017–2018)
Jean-Henry Céant, Prime Minister of Haiti (2018–2019)

President – Juan Orlando Hernández, President of Honduras (2014–2022)

Monarch – Elizabeth II, Queen of Jamaica (1962–present)
Governor-General – Sir Patrick Allen, Governor-General of Jamaica (2009–present)
Prime Minister – Andrew Holness, Prime Minister of Jamaica (2016–present)

President –
 Enrique Peña Nieto, President of Mexico (2012–2018)
 Andrés Manuel López Obrador, President of Mexico (2018–present)
 (Overseas Territory of the United Kingdom)
Governor – 
Elizabeth Carriere, Governor of Montserrat (2015–2018)
Lyndell Simpson, Acting Governor of Montserrat (2018)
Andrew Pearce, Governor of Montserrat (2018–present)
Premier – Donaldson Romeo, Premier of Montserrat (2014–2019)

President – Daniel Ortega, President of Nicaragua (2007–present)

President – Juan Carlos Varela, President of Panama (2014–2019)
 (Commonwealth of the United States)
Governor – Ricardo Rosselló, Governor of Puerto Rico (2017–2019)
  (overseas collectivity of France)
Prefect –
Anne Laubies, Prefect of Saint Barthélemy (2015–2018)
Sylvie Daniélo-Feucher, Prefect of Saint Barthélemy (2018–present)
Head of Government – Bruno Magras, President of the Territorial Council of Saint Barthélemy (2007–present)

Monarch – Elizabeth II, Queen of Saint Kitts and Nevis (1983–present)
Governor-General – Sir Tapley Seaton, Governor-General of Saint Kitts and Nevis (2015–present)
Prime Minister – Timothy Harris, Prime Minister of Saint Kitts and Nevis (2015–present)

Monarch – Elizabeth II, Queen of Saint Lucia (1979–present)
Governor-General – 
Emsco Remy, Acting Governor-General of Saint Lucia  (2018)
Sir Neville Cenac, Governor-General of Saint Lucia  (2018–2021)
Prime Minister – Allen Chastanet, Prime Minister of Saint Lucia (2016–2021)
 (overseas collectivity of France)
Prefect –
Anne Laubies, Prefect of Saint Barthélemy (2015–2018)
Sylvie Daniélo-Feucher, Prefect of Saint Barthélemy (2018–present)
Head of Government – Daniel Gibbs, President of the Territorial Council of Saint Martin (2017–present)
  (overseas collectivity of France)
Prefect –
Henri Jean, Prefect of Saint Pierre and Miquelon (2016–2018)
Thierry Devimeux, Prefect of Saint Pierre and Miquelon (2018–2021)
Head of Government – Stéphane Lenormand, President of the Territorial Council of Saint Pierre and Miquelon (2017–2020)

Monarch – Elizabeth II, Queen of Saint Vincent and the Grenadines (1979–present)
Governor-General – Sir Frederick Ballantyne, Governor-General of Saint Vincent and the Grenadines (2002–2019)
Prime Minister – Ralph Gonsalves, Prime Minister of Saint Vincent and the Grenadines (2001–present)
 (constituent country of the Kingdom of the Netherlands)
Governor – Eugene Holiday, Governor of Sint Maarten (2010–present)
Prime Minister –
 Rafael Boasman, Acting Prime Minister of Sint Maarten (2017–2018)
 Leona Marlin-Romeo, Prime Minister of Sint Maarten (2018–2019)

President –
Anthony Carmona, President of Trinidad and Tobago (2013–2018)
Paula-Mae Weekes, President of Trinidad and Tobago (2018–present)
Prime Minister – Keith Rowley, Prime Minister of Trinidad and Tobago (2015–present)
 (Overseas Territory of the United Kingdom)
Governor – John Freeman, Governor of the Turks and Caicos Islands (2016–2019)
Premier – Sharlene Cartwright-Robinson, Premier of the Turks and Caicos Islands (2016–present)

President – Donald Trump, President of the United States (2017–2021)
 (insular area of the United States)
Governor – Kenneth Mapp, Governor of the United States Virgin Islands (2015–2019)

Oceania
 (unorganised, unincorporated territory of the United States)
Governor – Lolo Matalasi Moliga, Governor of American Samoa (2013–present)

Monarch – Elizabeth II, Queen of Australia (1952–2022)
Governor-General – Sir Peter Cosgrove, Governor-General of Australia (2014–2019)
Prime Minister –
Malcolm Turnbull, Prime Minister of Australia (2015–2018)
Scott Morrison, Prime Minister of Australia (2018–2022)
 (external territory of Australia)
Administrator – Natasha Griggs, Administrator of Christmas Island (2017–present)
Shire-President – Gordon Thomson, Shire president of Christmas Island (2013–present)
 (external territory of Australia)
Administrator – Natasha Griggs, Administrator of the Cocos (Keeling) Islands (2017–present)
Shire-President – Seri Wati Iku, Shire president of the Cocos (Keeling) Islands (2017–2019)
 (associated state of New Zealand)
Queen's Representative – Sir Tom Marsters, Queen's Representative of the Cook Islands (2013–present)
Prime Minister – Henry Puna, Prime Minister of the Cook Islands (2010–2020)

President – Jioji Konrote, President of Fiji (2015–2021)
Prime Minister – Frank Bainimarama, Prime Minister of Fiji (2007–present)
  (overseas collectivity of France)
High Commissioner – René Bidal, High Commissioner of the Republic in French Polynesia (2016–2019)
President – Édouard Fritch, President of French Polynesia (2014–present)
 (insular area of the United States)
Governor – Eddie Baza Calvo, Governor of Guam (2011–2019)

President – Taneti Mamau, Bharath, President of Kiribati (2016–present)

President – Hilda Heine, President of the Marshall Islands (2016–2020)

President – Peter M. Christian, President of Micronesia (2015–2019)

President – Baron Waqa, President of Nauru (2013–2019)
  (sui generis collectivity of France)
High Commissioner – Thierry Lataste, High Commissioner of New Caledonia (2016–2019)
Head of Government – Philippe Germain, President of the Government of New Caledonia (2015–2019)

Monarch – Elizabeth II, Queen of New Zealand (1952–2022)
Governor-General – Dame Patsy Reddy, Governor-General of New Zealand (2016–2021)
Prime Minister –
Jacinda Ardern, Prime Minister of New Zealand (2017–2023)
Winston Peters, Acting Prime Minister of New Zealand (2018)
 (associated state of New Zealand)
Premier – Sir Toke Talagi, Premier of Niue (2008–present)
 (Commonwealth of the United States)
Governor – Ralph Torres, Governor of the Northern Mariana Islands (2015–present)

President – Tommy Remengesau, President of Palau (2013–2021)

Monarch – Elizabeth II, Queen of Papua New Guinea (1975–2022)
Governor-General – Sir Bob Dadae, Governor-General of Papua New Guinea (2017–present)
Prime Minister – Peter O'Neill, Prime Minister of Papua New Guinea (2011–2019)
 (Overseas Territory of the United Kingdom)
Governor –
Robin Shackell, Acting Governor of the Pitcairn Islands (2017–2018)
Laura Clarke, Governor of Pitcairn (2018–present)
Mayor – Shawn Christian, Mayor of the Pitcairn Islands (2014–2019)

Head of State – Tuimalealiʻifano Vaʻaletoʻa Sualauvi II, O le Ao o le Malo of Samoa (2017–present)
Prime Minister – Tuila'epa Sa'ilele Malielegaoi, Prime Minister of Samoa (1998–2021)

Monarch – Elizabeth II, Queen of the Solomon Islands (1978–2022)
Governor-General – Sir Frank Kabui, Governor-General of the Solomon Islands (2009–2019)
Prime Minister – Rick Houenipwela, Prime Minister of the Solomon Islands (2017–2019)
 (dependent territory of New Zealand)
Administrator –
Jonathan Kings, Administrator of Tokelau (2017–2018)
Ross Ardern, Administrator of Tokelau (2018–present)
Head of Government –
Siopili Perez, Head of Government of Tokelau (2017–2018)
Afega Gaualofa, Head of Government of Tokelau (2018–2019)

Monarch – Tupou VI, King of Tonga (2012–present)
Prime Minister – ʻAkilisi Pōhiva, Prime Minister of Tonga (2014–2019)

Monarch – Elizabeth II, Queen of Tuvalu (1978–2022)
Governor-General – Sir Iakoba Italeli, Governor-General of Tuvalu (2010–2020)
Prime Minister – Enele Sopoaga, Prime Minister of Tuvalu (2013–2019)

President – Tallis Obed Moses, President of Vanuatu (2017–present)
Prime Minister – Charlot Salwai, Prime Minister of Vanuatu (2016–2020)
  (overseas collectivity of France)
Administrator –
Christophe Lotigie, Acting Administrator Superior of Wallis and Futuna (2018–2019)
Jean-Francis Treffel, Administrator Superior of Wallis and Futuna (2017–2018)
Head of Government – David Vergé, President of the Territorial Assembly of Wallis and Futuna (2017–2019)

South America

President – Mauricio Macri, President of Argentina (2015–present)

President – Evo Morales, President of Bolivia (2006–2019)

President – Michel Temer, President of Brazil (2016–2018)

President –
 Michelle Bachelet, President of Chile (2014–2018)
 Sebastián Piñera, President of Chile (2018–2022)

President –
Juan Manuel Santos, President of Colombia (2010–2018)
Iván Duque Márquez, President of Colombia (2018–present)

President – Lenín Moreno, President of Ecuador (2017–2021)
 (Overseas Territory of the United Kingdom)
Governor – Nigel Phillips, Governor of the Falkland Islands (2017–present)
 Chief Executive – Barry Rowland, Chief Executive of the Falkland Islands (2016–present)

President – David A. Granger, President of Guyana (2015–2020)
Prime Minister – Moses Nagamootoo, Prime Minister of Guyana (2015–2020)

President –
Horacio Cartes, President of Paraguay (2013–2018)
Mario Abdo Benítez, President of Paraguay (2018–present)

President –
 Pedro Pablo Kuczynski, President of Peru (2016–2018)
 Martín Vizcarra, President of Peru (2018–2020)
Prime Minister –
Mercedes Aráoz, President of the Council of Ministers of Peru (2017–2018)
César Villanueva, President of the Council of Ministers of Peru (2018–present)

President – Dési Bouterse, President of Suriname (2010–2020)

President – Tabaré Vázquez, President of Uruguay (2015–2020)

President – Nicolás Maduro, President of Venezuela (2013–present)

See also
List of current heads of state and government

Notes

References

External links
CIDOB Foundation contextualised biographies of world political leaders
Portale Storia a list of current rulers by country
Rulersa list of rulers throughout time and places
WorldStatesmenan online encyclopedia of the leaders of nations and territories

State leaders
State leaders
State leaders
2018